Tomis Constanța  may refer to:
 C.S. Volei 2004 Tomis Constanța - female volleyball club from Constanța, Romania
 C.V.M. Tomis Constanța - male volleyball club from Constanța, Romania